Win It, Cook It is a British cookery game show that aired on Channel 4 from 4 August to 19 September 2014 and is hosted by Simon Rimmer.

References

External links

2010s British game shows
2014 British television series debuts
2014 British television series endings
Channel 4 game shows
English-language television shows